Lake Paatari is a lake in the Lapland region, Finland. It drains through the Juutuanjoki river into Lake Inari. Its main inflows are the rivers Lemmenjoki and Vaskojoki.

Paatsjoki basin
Lakes of Inari, Finland